Menzies Ministry may refer to any of the following ministries of the Australian Commonwealth:

 First Menzies Ministry
 Second Menzies Ministry
 Third Menzies Ministry
 Fourth Menzies Ministry
 Fifth Menzies Ministry
 Sixth Menzies Ministry
 Seventh Menzies Ministry
 Eighth Menzies Ministry
 Ninth Menzies Ministry
 Tenth Menzies Ministry